Emanuel Aiwu (born 25 December 2000) is an Austrian professional footballer who plays as a defender for  club Cremonese.

Club career
On 5 August 2022, Aiwu joined Serie A club Cremonese on a four-year contract, for a reported fee of €3.5 million.

Personal life
Born in Austria, Aiwu is of Nigerian descent.

Career statistics

References

2000 births
Living people
Austrian people of Nigerian descent
Austrian footballers
Association football defenders
Austria under-21 international footballers
Austria youth international footballers
Austrian Football Bundesliga players
Serie A players
FC Admira Wacker Mödling players
SK Rapid Wien players
U.S. Cremonese players
Austrian expatriate footballers
Austrian expatriate sportspeople in Italy
Expatriate footballers in Italy